Two ships of the Royal Navy have borne the  name Pentstemon (or Penstemon) after the flower:

, an  sloop launched in 1916 she was sold in 1920 into mercantile service as Lila. Subsequently, became the Chinese gunboat "Hai Chow" and sunk in 1937.
, a  launched in 1941 and sold in 1946 into mercantile service as Galaxidi.

References
 

Royal Navy ship names